George Huntingdon may refer to:

George Hastings, 1st Earl of Huntingdon (1488–1544), English peer, close friend of Henry VIII and the husband of the King's mistress, Anne Stafford
George Hastings, 4th Earl of Huntingdon (1540–1604), English nobleman, grandson of the above
George Hastings, 8th Earl of Huntingdon, (died 1705), English nobleman, son of the 7th Earl of Huntingdon

See also
George Huntington (disambiguation)